Karoo Sharqi is an area of Birot Kalan Union Council, Abbottabad Tehsil, Abbottabad District, Khyber Pakhtunkhwa, Pakistan. According to the 2017 Census of Pakistan,   the population of Karoo Sharqi is 6,337.

References

Populated places in Abbottabad District